Denver Downs Farmstead, also known as Garrison Farm, is an historic farm on the outskirts of Anderson, South Carolina.

Denver Downs is historically and architecturally significant as an extant working farm dating to 1872. The farmstead consists of 464 acres, but only 20 acres are considered to be part of this Historic Register nomination. In 1974, the farmstead was recognized as a “Century Farm,” having been owned and operated by the same family for 100 years. Denver Downs Farmstead was listed in the National Register March 7, 2007.

The main house is a large Colonial Revival farmhouse that features white clapboard siding, a metal roof, and a wraparound porch. The farmstead is bordered on one side by the Clemson Highway, but it is possible to view the farm from one of the public roads that cut through the property.

References

Houses on the National Register of Historic Places in South Carolina
Colonial Revival architecture in South Carolina
Houses completed in 1872
Houses in Anderson County, South Carolina
National Register of Historic Places in Anderson County, South Carolina